Democratic nominees for Governor of Kentucky:

1828 William T. Barry
1832 John Breathitt
1836 Matthew Flournoy
1840 Richard French
1844 William O. Butler
1848 Lazarus W. Powell
1851 Lazarus W. Powell
1855 Beverly L. Clarke
1859 Beriah Magoffin
1863 Charles A. Wickliffe
1867 John L. Helm
1871 Preston H. Leslie
1875 James B. McCreary
1879 Luke P. Blackburn
1883 J. Proctor Knott
1887 Simon B. Buckner
1891 John Young Brown
1895 P. Wat Hardin
1899 William Goebel
1903 J. C. W. Beckham
1907 Samuel W. Hager
1911 James B. McCreary
1915 Augustus O. Stanley
1919 James D. Black
1923 William J. Fields
1927 J. C. W. Beckham
1931 Ruby Laffoon
1935 Happy Chandler 
1939 Keen Johnson 
1943 J. Lyter Donaldson 
1947 Earle C. Clements 
1951 Lawrence Wetherby 
1955 Happy Chandler 
1959 Bert T. Combs 
1963 Edward T. Breathitt 
1967 Henry Ward (Kentucky) 
1971 Wendell H. Ford 
1975 Julian Carroll 
1979 John Y. Brown, Jr. 
1983 Martha Layne Collins 
1987 Wallace G. Wilkinson
1991 Brereton Jones 
1995 Paul E. Patton
1999 Paul E. Patton
2003 Ben Chandler
2007 Steve Beshear
2011 Steve Beshear
2015 Jack Conway

All except those in italics won the general election and were elected Governor of Kentucky.

Nominees,Democratic
Governor,nominees,Dem
Kentucky,Governor,Dem
+
Kentucky Governor nominees